is a Japanese voice actress and singer. Notable among her numerous roles in anime are Lacus Clyne in Mobile Suit Gundam Seed and Mobile Suit Gundam Seed Destiny, Chi in Chobits, Hikari Kujou/Shiny Luminous in Futari wa Pretty Cure Max Heart, Minna-Dietlinde Wilcke in Strike Witches and Suigintou in the anime adaptation of Rozen Maiden. In video games, she provides the voice of title character Neptune in the Hyperdimension Neptunia franchise, Morrigan Aensland in Ultimate Marvel vs. Capcom 3 and Project X Zone, Sesshoin Kiara in Fate/Extra and Fate/Grand Order, Murata Himeko in Honkai Impact 3rd, Mitsuru Kirijo in Persona 3, Lisa in Genshin Impact and Ciel in Megaman Zero.

Biography
When Tanaka was in elementary school, she was a member of the book club. She loved to read to others, and would give picture story shows to the younger students in the morning before the homeroom teacher came to the classroom. One of the activities of the book committee was to hold a picture-story show competition in the audio-visual room, and when the students saw her picture-story show, they were delighted. She loved reading and illustrations to begin with, especially those of Mutsumi Inomata, and her desire to become a voice actress was directly triggered when she bought and listened to the drama CD CD Theater Dragon Quest, whose jacket illustration was done by Inomata, at a bookstore.

When she was in high school, she was a member of the Manga Research Club and participated in the Manga Nationals, where she directly appealed to Kazuhiko Shimamoto, a judge from her hometown, that she wanted to be a voice actor. After graduating from high school, she moved to Tokyo and enrolled in the voice acting course at Yoyogi Animation Academy. As she was very fond of reading and taking care of children, becoming a nursery teacher was also a big dream of hers. She was torn between going on to higher education and becoming a nursery teacher or becoming a voice actor, but she chose the latter because she wanted to bring her voice to children in a larger world, not stopping at one world. While still in school, Tanaka won the grand prize at the vocal audition held by MediaWorks & Scitron Digital Contents. She made her debut in the entertainment industry when she sang the opening theme song for the PlayStation version of "Eien no Shin'yū" in Yūkyū Gensōkyoku 2nd Album. This is why her debut as a singer was earlier than her debut as a voice actor. At the same time, she also participated in the theatrical anime Rurouni Kenshin: The Motion Picture as a minor role. She made her debut as an agency voice actress in 1999, playing the role of Mitsuki Sanada, one of the heroines in Dual! Parallel Trouble Adventure. 2006 saw her first starring role as Hiroko Matsukata in Hataraki Man.

Due to management reasons, Tanaka moved from Dramatic Department, to which she had belonged for many years, to Retreat on April 1, 2008, and to Office Anemone on March 1, 2019.

In addition to voice acting, Tanaka is also active in music, singing character songs for some works, and sometimes releasing singles under her own name. On April 26, 2019, it was announced that she will be working as a Youtuber under the show name "Rie Tanaka TV."

Personal life
Tanaka's favorite phrase is "Never get discouraged, never run away, never give up," and she has been actively increasing her Twitter friends since around 2010, including Rina Satō and Kenjiro Hata. However, on June 23, 2013, a man with a knife intruded a Neptunia promotion where Tanaka was present, yelling "Give me Tanaka! I am the victim!". In the hustle, Tanaka fell and bruised her knee, and after the incident, she took a break from Twitter and later returned in 2014.

On June 17, 2012, Tanaka announced on her blog that she had married voice actor Kōichi Yamadera. A year later, she disbanded her official fan club, "Cafe de Rie." She co-starred with Yamadera as Kusuo's maternal grandparents in 2016's The Disastrous Life of Saiki K.. On August 3, 2018, she announced on Twitter that she and Yamadera had divorced in July.

Filmography

Anime

Film

Video games

Tokusatsu

Drama CDs

Dubbing

Discography

Songs anime/video games
 Azumanga Daioh
 Oishii Kimitachi (Yomi's image song)
 Sorezore no One Way (Yomi's second image song)
 Bakuretsu Tenshi – Breathe (Sei's image song)
 Chobits
 Raison d'être (ED1) (Reason To Be)
 Ningyo hime (ED2) (Doll/Mermaid Princess)
 I Hear You Everywhere (Chi image song)
 Hitomi no Tonneru
 Shiranai Sora
 Dual! Parallel Trouble Adventure
 "DUAL!" (alternate version in episode 14)
 Mega Man Zero Soundtracks
 L'oiseau du Bonheur (vocal version of Ciel's theme, 'Labo', for Remastered Tracks Rockman Zero IDEA)
 Freesia (vocal version of the 'Promise -Next New World- (Overseas Version)' and 'Esperanto' songs for Remastered Tracks Rockman Zero PHYSIS)
 Gundam SEED
 Shizuka na Yoru ni (静かな夜に, In the Quiet Night)
 Mizu no Akashi (水の証, Token of Water)
 Hayate no Gotoku!
 Epu Romanesque (Maria character song)
 Kakurenbo (2nd character song)
 Kanpeki, Egao Desu
 Gundam SEED Destiny
 Fields of Hope
 EMOTION
 Quiet Night C.E. 73
 Hyperdimension Neptunia
 Lady Cool　-パープルハート- (Neptune's image song)
 スマイル・スパイラル (Neptune/Nepgear image song, performed with Yui Horie)
 Hanaukyo Maid Tai – Song of the Hanaukyo Maid team
 Hanaukyo Maid Tai La Verite – Voice of heart
 Mabinogi – Eternal (for the commercial of the Mabinogi game in Japan)
Toradora! Character Song Album
TANPOPO (Yuri Koigakubo's theme)

Singles

Raison d'être
Released May 22, 2002, Victor Entertainment.

 Raison d'être
 Hitomi no Tunnel
 Raison d'être (Original Karaoke)

Ningyo Hime
Released August 21, 2002, Victor Entertainment.

 Ningyo Hime
 Soshite Sekai wa Kyomo Hajimaru -Chii Ver.-
 Kata Koto no Koi -Chii Ver.-
 Ningyo Hime (without Rie)

Yasashii Jikan no Naka de
Released August 10, 2009, label unknown.

 Yasashii Jikan no Naka de
 Yasashii Jikan no Naka de (Piano version)
 Yasashii Jikan no Naka de ~Instrumental~

Albums

garnet
Released February 7, 2001, Aniplex Music.

 Eien ni Shinyu (a cappella version)
 Boku wa kimi ga suki
 Have You Never Been Mellow
 KISS Kara Hajimaru Miracle (Jazz Version)
 Like a favorite song
 garnet
 Umi no mieru oka de
 Anata ni nita hito
 SKY
 Tadaima

24 wishes

Released January 3, 2003, Victor Entertainment.

Kokoro
Release: October 20, 2010, Geneon Universal.

 Let it be
 Dilemma
 in or out?
 
 SUPERMAN
 
 FRAME
 
 
 Orange

Mini albums

Chara de Rie
Released September 10, 2003, Victor Entertainment. The album reached No. 34 on Oricon weekly chart and stayed on charts in 4 weeks.

 Katakoto no Koi -Chii Ver.-
 Let Me Be With You -Chii Ver.-
 Soshite Sekai wa Kyou mo Hajimaru -Chii Ver.-
 Mizu no Akashi -Acoustic Ver.-
 Shizuka na Yoru ni
 JUDY

References

External links
 Official agency profile 
  
 
 
 Rie Tanaka on Instagram. Archived from the original
 
 
 
 

1984 births
Japanese women pop singers
Japanese video game actresses
Japanese voice actresses
Living people
Voice actresses from Sapporo
Musicians from Sapporo
NBCUniversal Entertainment Japan artists
20th-century Japanese actresses
21st-century Japanese actresses
21st-century Japanese singers
21st-century Japanese women singers